Andrique Allisop (born 2 June 1993) is a Seychellois amateur boxer. He was born in Victoria, the capital of Seychelles. He won sportsman of the year 2012 and 2014 in Seychelles

Coached by Rival Payet he represented Seychelles in the 2012 Summer Olympics taking place in London in the Lightweight Division. In the Round of 32 he lost to Jai Bhagwan of India 8–18.

He took up boxing at the age of 13.

Allisop qualified for the 2016 Summer Olympics in Rio de Janeiro, where he was defeated by David Joyce in the first round of the Lightweight event.

Achievements
 2014 – AIBA Africa Cup (East London, RSA) 1st place – 60 kg
 2012 – AIBA African Olympic Qualification Tournament (Casablanca, MAR) 3rd place – 60 kg
 2011 – Indian Ocean Islands Games (Roche Caiman, SEY) 1st place – 56 kg
 2010 – Le Mamelles Tournament (Victoria, SEY) 2nd place – 57 kg
 2010 – African Youth Games (Casablanca, MAR) 2nd place – 57 kg
 2010 – Danas Pozniakas Youth Memorial Tournament (Vilnius, LTU) 3rd place

References

1993 births
Living people
Lightweight boxers
Olympic boxers of Seychelles
Seychellois male boxers
Boxers at the 2012 Summer Olympics
Boxers at the 2016 Summer Olympics
Boxers at the 2014 Commonwealth Games
Commonwealth Games competitors for Seychelles
People from Greater Victoria, Seychelles